The 163rd Military Intelligence Battalion is a military intelligence battalion of the United States Army based at Fort Hood under the 504th Military Intelligence Brigade (Expeditionary) supporting III Corps.

Lineage 

 Constituted 5 April 1945 in the Army of the United States as the 163rd Language Department
 Activated 23 April 1945 in the Philippine Islands
 Re-organised and re-designated 25 September 1949 as the 163rd Military Intelligence Service Detachment
 Allotted 19 December 1950 to the Regular Army and re-designated as the 163rd Military Intelligence Service Platoon
 Re-organised and re-designated 28 March 1954 as the 163rd Military Intelligence Platoon
 Inactivated 15 November 1954 in South Korea
 Activated 26 December 1955 in Italy
 Re-organised and re-designated 20 September 1957 as the 163rd Military Intelligence Battalion
 Inactivated 25 April 1964 in Italy
 Activated at Fort Hood, Texas (A Company re-organised and re-designated 21 April 1978 as B Company, 529th Military Intelligence Company [see ANNEX] concurrently re-organised and re-designated as A Company)
 Battalion inactivated 15 September 1997 at Fort Hood, Texas
 Activated 16 January 2006 at Fort Hood, Texas

ANNEX

 Constituted 14 July 1945 in the Army of the United States as the 225th (Independent) Prisoner of War Team and activated in West Germany
 Inactivated 30 November 1946 in West Germany
 Re-designated 1 October 1948 as the 529th Interrogation Team and allotted to the Regular Army
 Activated 15 October 1948 at Fort Riley, Kansas
 Inactivated 10 February 1949 at Fort Riley, Kansas
 Re-designated 17 March 1965 as the 529th Military Intelligence Company
 Activated 19 March 1965 at Fort Hood, Texas

Honours 
Campaign Participation Credit

 World War II: Luzon
 Korean War: UN Defensive, UN Offensive, CCF Intervention, First UN Counteroffensive, CCF Spring Offensive, UN Summer-Fall Offensive, Second Korean Winter, Korea Summer-Fall 1952, Third Korean Winter, Korean Summer 1953

Decorations

 Presidential Unit Citation (Navy) for INCHON
 Presidential Unit Citation (Navy) for HWACHON RESERVOIR
 Navy Unit Commendation for PANMUNJOM
 Philippine Presidential Unit Citation for 17 OCTOBER 1944 TO 4 JULY 1945
 Republic of Korea Presidential Unit Citation for KOREA 1950-1953

Heraldic Items 
Coat of Arms

 The two crossed anchors allude to the two Presidential Unit Citations (Navy) and the trident refers to the Navy Unit Commendation.
 Shield: Azure on a bend, chequy argent and sable, overall a Philippine sun charged with a Korean taeguk in the colours of the Republic of Korea, scarlet and blue.
 Crest: On a wreath of the colours, argent and azure, a trident argent interlaced with two anchors in saltire or.
 Motto: "KNOWLEDGE IS POWER"
 Symbolism: The sun alludes to service in the Philippines during World War II and to the Philippine Presidential Unit Citation. The taeguk symbolises the Republic of Korea Presidential Unit Citation and the unit's ten campaigns in the Korean War. The black and white chequy alludes to the intelligence functions of the organisation. Oriental blue and silver gray are the colours used by intelligence units.

Distinctive Unit Insignia

 The distinctive unit insignia consists of elements of the shield, crest, and mottos of the coat of arms.

References 

 
 
Military units and formations established in 1945
Military units and formations established in 1955
Military units and formations established in 1969
Military units and formations established in 2006
Military units and formations disestablished in 1954
Military units and formations disestablished in 1964
Military units and formations disestablished in 1997
Military intelligence units and formations of the United States Army